Avantasia is a symphonic metal project by Tobias Sammet.

Avantasia may also refer to:
 Avantasia (song), a single by the band 
 Avantasia (story), a story composed as metal album by Tobias Sammet's Avantasia